Datuk Wira Hajah Mas Ermieyati binti Samsudin (Jawi: مس إرمياتي بنت شمس الدين; born 13 November 1976) is a Malaysian politician who has served as the Member of Parliament (MP) for Masjid Tanah since May 2013. She served as Deputy Minister in the Prime Minister's Department in charge of Parliament and Law in the Barisan Nasional (BN) administration under former Prime Minister Ismail Sabri Yaakob and former Minister Wan Junaidi from August 2021 to the collapse of BN administration in November 2022, Deputy Minister of Entrepreneur Development And Cooperatives in the Perikatan Nasional (PN) administration under former Prime Minister Muhyiddin Yassin and former Minister Wan Junaidi from March 2020 to the collapse of the PN administration in August 2021 and the Deputy Minister of Tourism and Culture in the Barisan Nasional (BN) administration under former Prime Minister Najib Razak and former Minister Mohamed Nazri Abdul Aziz from July 2015 to the collapse of the BN administration in May 2018 and Women Youth Chief of the United Malays National Organisation (UMNO) from October 2013 to June 2018.

She is a member of the Malaysian United Indigenous Party (BERSATU), a component party of the ruling PN coalition and was a former member of UMNO, a component party of the BN coalition. After the defeat of BN to the Pakatan Harapan (PH) opposition coalition in the 2018 general election, she resigned from UMNO in 2018 and joined BERSATU in 2019. She was also appointed the Deputy Women Chief of BERSATU.

Early life and educations
She was born on 13 November 1976 at the Malacca General Hospital and is the second child of Hjh Salbiah Ahmad and Hj Samsudin Md Ali. Raised in Malacca and earned an early education at Methodist Girls School (2) Tengkera, Melaka and Sekolah Kebangsaan Ramuan China Besar, Masjid Tanah Melaka. She then received an offer to Full Boarding School, Sekolah Tun Fatimah, Johor Bahru (1989-1993) and further her studies at Law Matriculation and Law Degree in National University of Malaysia (UKM), Bangi, Selangor.

Career
After graduating from the Law Degree in UKM, she started her career as an advocate and solicitor at lawyer Khairul Latif & Associates and Adillah A. Nordin. In 2004, with two partners, Mohd Khairul Nizam Abd Kadir and Desmond Ho Chee Cheong opened his own legal firm, Messrs. Ermiey Nizam & Ho. The same time of interest in volunteer work is well-suited to the soul. Since school age and as early as 15, she has been active with the Association of Youth Movement 4B (GB4B). She is currently the Member of the GB4B Malaysia Top Council Member.

Youth activism and NGO
Mas Ermieyati is a youth activist. At the Melaka State level, she is the Chairman of the 4B (M) Youth Mosque of Tanah Masjid and the Youth Movement of the 4B (M) Youth Movement of Malacca. At the national level, she was the Chairman of the 4B Malaysia Youth Movement Culture Bureau, the Secretary of the 4B Malaysia Youth Movement Discipline Committee and the Malaysian Youth Movement 4B Youth Movement. She is currently the Council Member of the 4B Malaysia Youth Youth Movement.

Politics

Early involvement
She was involved in politics since becoming a lawyer in 2001 when the third UMNO wing of PUTERI was agreed by the UMNO President to be established throughout the country. This time she was offered a seat in the sponsorship committee at Alor Gajah. In 2003, she became the Chairwoman of PUTERI UMNO Division of Alor Gajah and the Head of PUTERI State of Melaka (new delineation of 2004 changed to the Masjid Tanah Division) for 10 years until 2013 and during the same period, she was also EXCO PUTERI UMNO Malaysia.

General Election 2013
In the 2013 Malaysian general election, Mas Ermieyati was elected the Masjid Tanah MP as the Barisan National candidate, defeating PAS candidate Mohd Nasaie Bin Ismail. She obtained 27,688 votes compared to her opponent's 11,488 votes. She represented Malaysia abroad in conferences such as the 34th General Assembly of the ASEAN Inter-Parliamentary Assembly (AIPA), and the Women In Parliament Forum. In 2014, she represented the Malaysian Parliament in Tehran for the 9th Parliamentary Union of OIC Member States (Puic) Conference and Meetings.

Malacca state election 2021

Personal life
She married Mohd Helmy Abd Talib and blessed with 4 sons that are Haiqal, Hakim, Hafiy and Hasif and a daughter named Eiman Miesha.

Election results

Honours
  :
  Companion Class I  of the Exalted Order of Malacca (DCSM) – Datuk (2014)
  Knight Commander of the Exalted Order of Malacca (DCSM) – Datuk Wira (2017)

See also
 Masjid Tanah (federal constituency)
 Tanjung Bidara (state constituency)

References

External links
 
 Mas Ermieyati Samsudin MP profile 

1976 births
Living people
People from Malacca
Malaysian people of Malay descent
Malaysian Muslims
21st-century Malaysian lawyers
Malaysian United Indigenous Party politicians
Independent politicians in Malaysia
Former United Malays National Organisation politicians
Members of the Dewan Rakyat
Women members of the Dewan Rakyat
Women in Malacca politics
National University of Malaysia alumni
21st-century Malaysian politicians
Malaysian women lawyers
21st-century Malaysian women politicians